Lorenzo Amaya (5 September 1896 – 12 June 1969) was an Argentine sports shooter. He competed at the 1924 Summer Olympics and the 1936 Summer Olympics.

References

External links
 

1896 births
1969 deaths
Argentine male sport shooters
Olympic shooters of Argentina
Shooters at the 1924 Summer Olympics
Shooters at the 1936 Summer Olympics
Sportspeople from San Miguel de Tucumán